The William J. Barnard Residence, also known as Green Shadows and Thornbury Lodge, is a historic home located in Thornbury Township, Chester County, Pennsylvania. It was designed in 1900, and the building was completed in 1907.  It was designed by W.E. Jackson, a student of Wilson Eyre, a noted Philadelphia architect. It is a two-story, banked stone dwelling faced in rubble "Brandywine Granite."  It features a steeply pitched slate gable roof with cross gable.  Also on the property is a contributing former stable, later converted to a residence known as Green Echo.

It was listed on the National Register of Historic Places in 1982.

References

Houses on the National Register of Historic Places in Pennsylvania
Houses completed in 1907
Houses in Chester County, Pennsylvania
Farms in Pennsylvania
National Register of Historic Places in Chester County, Pennsylvania